The 1997  Philippine Basketball Association (PBA) rookie draft was an event at which teams drafted players from the amateur ranks. The annual rookie draft was held on January 19, 1997, at the Glorietta Mall in Makati.

Round 1

Round 2

Notes
The top two draft picks; Andrew John Seigle and Nic Belasco were born outside the Philippines. It was the first time in league history that a pure-born Filipino player was not chosen as the overall top pick.

References

Philippine Basketball Association draft
draft